Grynaeus may refer to:
 Johann Jakob Grynaeus (1540–1617), Swiss Protestant clergyman
 Samuel Gryneaus (1539–1599), Swiss jurist
 Simon Grynaeus (1493–1541), German scholar and theologian
 Simon Grynaeus the Younger (1539–1582), Swiss mathematician and university professor
 Simon Grynaeus (1725–1799), Biblical scholar and translator
 Thomas Grynaeus (1512–1564), Swiss Protestant clergyman

Surnames of German origin